Technip S.A. was a company that carried out project management, engineering and construction for the energy industry; in 2017 it completed a merger with FMC Technologies to form TechnipFMC. Its headquarters were in the 16th arrondissement of Paris. It has about 38,000 employees and operates in 48 countries.

Overview 
Technip is primarily in the energy business and is active in three business segments, namely Subsea, Offshore & Onshore. It has around 38,000 employees and operates in 48 countries. It owns a fleet of 21 vessels in operation with 6 more under construction. As of the end of 2014, while the operating income of Technip Group from recurring activities stood at ~ Euros 825 million, the total revenues stood at more than Euros 10.7 billion.

History 

Technip was established in 1958 by IFP, Institut français du pétrole, as Compagnie française d'études et de construction Technip.

In the 1960s, the company completed its first international projects in Africa and Asia. In the 1970s Technip became an international group with the acquisition of an office in Rome and the creation of Technip Geoproduction, a subsidiary specialized in hydrocarbon field equipment. During this period, Coflexip – a firm specialized in the design, manufacture and supply of flexible subsea flowlines – was created by the IFP (French Petroleum Institute) and opened a flexible flowline manufacturing plant in Le Trait, France, as well as offices in Houston, Aberdeen and Rio de Janeiro.

In the 1980s Technip opened operating centers in Kuala Lumpur and Abu Dhabi. Coflexip opened a second flowline manufacturing plant in Brazil and branched out into the manufacture of umbilicals with the establishment of the Duco plant in Newcastle, UK.

Coflexip acquired Stena Offshore while Technip acquired several companies with strong technological expertise: Speichim, Krebs and KTI. Already established in the United States, KTI enabled Technip to set up in North America. Coflexip established a presence in Australia and acquired the Norwegian company Stena Offshore.

In the 2000s, Technip merged with Coflexip, which had just acquired Aker Maritime's Deepwater Division. The unified group is now one of the top five companies worldwide in engineering, technology and services for the energy industry. Many major contracts are signed, notably in the Middle East in the liquefied natural gas (LNG), ethylene and refining sectors.

In 2010 three major assets came into operation: the Technip fleet expanded to 17 vessels with the addition of the Apache II, one of the most advanced pipelay vessels in the industry, and the Skandi Vitoria, a Brazilian-flagged vessel dedicated to the pre-salt market. Asiaflex Products, the Group’s third flexible pipe production plant, located in Tanjung Langsat, Malaysia was inaugurated.

In 2011, Technip acquired Global Industries, substantially expanding its addressable market in subsea.

In 2012 Technip acquired Stone & Webster Process Technologies and associated oil and gas engineering capabilities from The Shaw Group.

Merger with FMC 
In 2017, FMC Technologies Inc. and Technip agreed to merge, forming a significant new player in an energy industry racked by a nearly two-year slump in crude prices.

The all-share deal would result in a new company named TechnipFMC with a market value of about $13 billion.

TechnipFMC has three headquarters in Houston, Paris and London under new Houston-based CEO Doug Pferdehirt, who worked as FMC’s chief operating officer. Former Technip chairman and CEO Thierry Pilenko is the new executive chairman.

In August 2019, Doug Pferdehirt announces that TechnipFMC will be split into two independent engineering companies. The separation is expected to be completed by the end of the first semester 2020. The former Technip entity, without the subsea business, was renamed Technip Energies.

Listings 
In the 1990s Technip was listed on the Paris Stock Exchange and Coflexip on the New York Stock Exchange. Technip was included in the CAC40 French benchmark index in September 2009.

Controversies 
In June 2010 Technip S.A. agreed to pay a $338 million criminal penalty to resolve charges related to the Foreign Corrupt Practices Act (FCPA) for its participation in a decade-long scheme to bribe Nigerian government officials to obtain engineering, procurement and construction (EPC) contracts.

In 2011, the US Securities & Exchange Commission (SEC) filed a lawsuit in the federal Southern District of New York alleging insider trading.

Organization
Technip was certified as one of the first five companies in the world as a Global Top-Employer 2015 which recognizes first-class employee offerings globally and equally. This independent certification delivered by the Top Employers Institute demonstrates the quality and consistency of the company’s human resources policies and practices all around the globe.

Technip has also been certified as a Top-Employer in 24 countries (Australia, Brazil, China, Colombia, France, Germany, India, Indonesia, Italy, Malaysia, Mexico, Netherlands, Norway, Portugal, Qatar, Russia, Singapore, Spain, Thailand, United Arab Emirates, United Kingdom, United States, Venezuela and Vietnam) as well as in three regions (Asia-Pacific, Europe and Latin America).

In July 2015, it was announced that the company would lay off 6,000 employees due to the industry downturn.

Financial and stock market information 

The Technip share is listed on Euronext Paris and on the American over-the-counter market.

 ISIN: FR0000131708
 Nominal value: euro

The Technip share is included in the Dow Jones Sustainability Index and the Low Carbon 100 index and the ASPI Eurozone.

(a) Does not include the exercise of options arising from the current share purchase or share subscription option plans.

References

External links

2017 mergers and acquisitions
Business services companies established in 1958
Companies formerly listed on the Paris Bourse
Companies formerly listed on the New York Stock Exchange
Construction and civil engineering companies of France
Construction and civil engineering companies established in 1958
Construction and civil engineering companies disestablished in 2017
Engineering companies of France
Energy engineering and contractor companies
Design companies established in 1958
Energy companies established in 1958
Energy companies disestablished in 2017
French companies established in 1958
French companies disestablished in 2017
Non-renewable resource companies established in 1958